Abdennour Iheb Belhocini (born 18 August 1996) is an Algerian footballer who plays as a midfielder for Club Africain.

References 

Living people
1996 births
Algerian footballers
Algerian expatriate footballers
Association football midfielders
USM Bel Abbès players
Umm Salal SC players
Al-Wakrah SC players
Algerian Ligue Professionnelle 1 players
Qatar Stars League players
Expatriate footballers in Qatar
Algerian expatriate sportspeople in Qatar
21st-century Algerian people